La luz de mis ojos is a Colombian musical comedy-drama telenovela directed by Jorge Alí Triana for RCN Televisión. The series is written by Gerardo Pinzón and Claudia Rojas. It stars Laura de León and Édgar Vittorino as the titular characters.

Plot summary 
Soledad is a young woman who, despite not seeing, sings and dances with her soul because she carries the music of the Colombian Caribbean in her veins. However, she is the victim of her mother's contempt for an unforeseen event a few years ago and her dream of becoming a porro singer. For his part, Vicente, who is committed to his cousin Amira Rebecca, will have to make a difficult decision since true love has arisen with Soledad. However, Amira will do everything in her power to prevent him from canceling the marriage since she and her mother are interested in having all the money in the family, so he will resort to a false pregnancy. Finally, Soledad and his baby fruit of the love with Vicente will be who will pay the consequences of the bad decisions of his mother and of the family of Vicente as this will make the love between them becomes impossible.

Cast 
 Laura de León as Soledad Burgos
 Édgar Vittorino as Vicente Bula Chaid
 Majida Issa as Faride Chaid
 Daniela Tapia as Amira Rebeca Bula
 Tahimi Alvariño as Delfina Ricardo
 José Lombana as Adahir Lamprea
 Lucas Zaffari as Silvino Bula Chadid
 Brian Flaccus as Juan Abel
 Gaby Garrido as Romina Paternina
 Katherine Vélez as Guillermina "Mema" Chaid
 Johan Rivera as Pacho Mogolla
 Amanda Peter as Soledad Burgos
 John Alex Castillo as Crescencio Constantino
 Rodrigo Brand as Vicente
 Brittany Falardeau as Amira Rebeca Bula
 Libby Brien as Teresita Pretel
 Susana Torres as Evangelina Chaid
 Juan Carlos Messier as Eduardo Bula
 Orlando Lamboglia as David Bula
 Emerson Rodríguez as Silvino Bula Chaid
 María Eugenia Arboleda as Dominga
 Philip Hersh as Dr. Márquez
 Salvo Basile as Fuad Chaid
 Mimí Anaya as Cecilia

References 

Colombian telenovelas
Spanish-language telenovelas
RCN Televisión telenovelas
2017 telenovelas
2017 Colombian television series debuts
Television shows set in Colombia